A River Ain't Too Much to Love is the eleventh studio album by Smog. It was released on May 30, 2005 in Europe by Domino Recording Company and in North America by Drag City. It is Bill Callahan's final studio album released under the Smog moniker.

Critical reception

At Metacritic, which assigns a weighted average score out of 100 to reviews from mainstream critics, the album received an average score of 76, based on 29 reviews, indicating "generally favorable reviews".

Track listing

Personnel
Credits adapted from liner notes.

 Bill Callahan – vocals, guitar, various instruments, production
 Connie Lovatt – vocals, bass guitar
 Travis Weller – fiddle
 Thor Harris – zills (2), hammer dulcimer (5), air-drums (5)
 Joanna Newsom – piano (4)
 Jim White – drums
 Steve Chadie – engineering
 Chris "Frenchie" Smith – mixing (5)
 Nick Webb – mastering

References

External links
 

2005 albums
Bill Callahan (musician) albums
Drag City (record label) albums
Domino Recording Company albums
Lo-fi music albums